Sphingobacterium hotanense is a Gram-negative, strictly aerobic and non-motile bacterium from the genus of Sphingobacterium which has been isolated from the Populus euphratica forest from the Hotan River valley in China.

References

External links
Type strain of Sphingobacterium hotanense at BacDive -  the Bacterial Diversity Metadatabase

Sphingobacteriia
Bacteria described in 2013